MS Regal Star is a Ro-Ro ship owned by the Estonian shipping company Tallink. The vessel was built in 1993 in Saint Petersburg and completed in 2000 in Naples, Italy. Regal Star is registered under the Estonian flag and its home port is Tallinn.

Description

History
The ship was built in 1993 as yard number 668 by Sudostroitelnyy Zavod Severnaya Verf, Saint Petersburg, Russia. The IMO Number 9087116 was allocated. She was laid up after launch and was sold in 1999. She was completed in 2000 by Palumba SpA, Naples, Italy for  MCL SrL, Naples. Her port of registry was Naples. She entered service in March 2000 on the Savona–Catania route. In September, she was chartered by Grimaldi Ferries and entered service on the Salerno–Palermo–Valencia route.

In December 2003, Regal Star was sold to Hansatee Shipping, Tallinn, Estonia. She was transferred to the Estonian flag and  placed under the management of Tallink Group. On 13 March 2003, the ship started operating on the Paldiski–Kapellskär route. In March 2006, she was transferred to the Tallinn–Helsinki  route. She collided with the quayside at Helsinki and damaged her stern. Following repairs, she returned to service in January 2007 on  the Paldiski–Kapellskär route. From June 2010, Regal Star operated on the Turku–Stockholm route. She returned to the Paldiski–Kapellskär route on 1 September 2010.

References

External links 
 MS Regal Star on Tallink's website

1993 ships
Ships built at Severnaya Verf
Ferries of Italy
Ferries of Estonia